Cryptophasa zorodes is a moth in the family Xyloryctidae. It was described by Turner in 1917. It is found in Australia, where it has been recorded from the Northern Territory.

The wingspan is about 48 mm. The forewings are pale grey and the hindwings are grey-whitish.

References

Cryptophasa
Moths described in 1917